Re Harris Simons Construction Ltd [1989] 1 WLR 368 is a UK insolvency law case concerning the administration procedure when a company is unable to repay its debts.

Facts
Harris Simons Construction Ltd was a building company. From April 1985 to 1988 its turnover increased from £830,000 to £27 million. It all came from one client called Berkley House plc. They had a close relationship but it went sour, and Berkley purported to dismiss them. It withheld several million pounds in payments. Harris Simons could not pay debts as they fell due or carry on trading. The report of the proposed administrator said it would be very difficult to sell any part of the business. Berkley said if an administration order were made it would give enough funding to let the company complete four contracts on condition it remove itself from the sites that were in dispute. The company therefore proposed an administration order under the Insolvency Act 1986, section 8(3) (now Insolvency Act 1986, Schedule B1, para 12(1)(a)). The question was whether the court should exercise its jurisdiction and whether the order would be likely to achieve the specified purposes of administration (now found in the Insolvency Act 1986, Schedule B1, para 3).

Judgment
Hoffmann J held that an administration order should be made because there was a reasonable possibility that a purpose of administration, i.e. saving the company or business, would be achieved. This could also be termed as a "real prospect", or a "good arguable case". It did not need to be satisfied that the administration would succeed on the "balance of probabilities", although there needed to be a greater prospect of success than just a "mere possibility". His judgment went as follows.

See also

UK insolvency law

Notes

References
L Sealy and S Worthington, Cases and Materials in Company Law (9th edn OUP 2010)
R Goode, Principles of Corporate Insolvency Law (4th edn Sweet & Maxwell 2011)

United Kingdom insolvency case law
High Court of Justice cases
1989 in British law
1989 in case law